The UEFA Women's Euro 2025 qualifying competition will be a women's football competition that determines the 14 or 15 teams joining the automatically qualified hosts in the UEFA Women's Euro 2025 final tournament.

Format
The European Qualifiers start in spring 2024, following the conclusion of the Women's Nations League. The qualifiers are composed of a league stage and final tournament play-offs.

The league stage is played in the same format as the Nations League, with teams split into three leagues: League A with 16 teams, League B with 16 teams and League C with 19 teams. Each team’s starting league position is determined based on the results of the Nations League, as described above.

Again, teams compete in groups of four or three teams (League C) and over six matchdays, with each team playing one home match and one away match against all the other teams in their group.

The ultimate goals of this phase of the competition are to qualify for the UEFA Women's Euro 2025, and to be positioned as high as possible in the league system for the next cycle.

The European Qualifiers ranking at the end of the league stage determines three main outcomes: who qualifies directly for the final tournament, who goes into the play-offs for the final tournament, and what starting league position teams will have in the upcoming Nations League. Depending on the league standings, teams will either maintain their position in the league or be automatically promoted or relegated.

The final European Qualifiers league ranking will reward the eight top teams in League A with direct qualification for UEFA Women's Euro 2025. If the team of the host association have not qualified automatically, they will be guaranteed a slot. In the case of multiple hosts, this guarantee will cover a maximum of two teams.

The remaining slots will be contested over two rounds of home-and-away European Qualifiers play-offs. The play-off path illustrated below may be adjusted to take into account the performance of the team(s) of the host association(s).

In the first round, the teams finishing third and fourth in League A will play the winners and three best-ranked runners-up in League C. The eight winners progress to the second round.

The four group winners and two best-ranked runners-up in League B will be drawn into six ties against the remaining two runners-up and four third-placed teams in League B. The six winners progress to the second round.

In the second round, the teams will be drawn into seven ties, with the seven winners progressing to the final tournament.

Qualified teams
The following teams will qualify or qualified for the final tournament.

1 Bold indicates champions for that year. Italic indicates hosts for that year.

References

2025
2023 in women's association football
2024 in women's association football
Women's Euro
Women's Euro